Devaki is the mother of Krishna in Hinduism.

Devaki may also refer to:

Devaki (1951 film)
Devaki (2005 film)
Devaki (2019 film)